Arthur Watts may refer to:

Arthur Watts (illustrator) (1883–1935), British illustrator and artist
Arthur Watts (barrister) (1931–2007), British lawyer
Arthur Watts (politician) (1897–1970), Australian politician
Arthur Watts (swimmer) (1911–1962), English Olympic swimmer
Arthur Thomas Watts (1837–1921), Texan politician

See also
Arthur Watt (1891–1973), Australian cricketer
John Arthur Watts (1947–2016), British MP from Slough
William Arthur Watts (1930–2010), professor in botany